Marin Fronc (born 28 November 1947) is a Slovak politician and former Minister of Education of Slovakia. He studied at Comenius University in Bratislava at Faculty of natural sciences. His studies were focused on mathematics. His academic career continued at University of Transport and Communications in Žilina where achieved several academic titles. He entered politics in 1989 as a member of Christian Democratic Movement and after elections in 2002 he became Minister of Education of Slovakia. Martin Fronc is married and he has three children.

References

External links 
 KDH: Doc. Mgr. MARTIN FRONC PhD. – page about Marin Fronc on website of Christian Democratic Movement, in Slovak

1947 births
Living people
Politicians from Košice
Christian Democratic Movement politicians
Members of the National Council (Slovakia) 2006-2010
Members of the National Council (Slovakia) 2010-2012
Members of the National Council (Slovakia) 2012-2016